Wo Yi Hop is a village and an area in Shing Mun Valley, Tsuen Wan District, Hong Kong.

Administration
Wo Yi Hop is a recognized village under the New Territories Small House Policy. It is one of the villages represented within the Tsuen Wan Rural Committee. For electoral purposes, Wo Yi Hop is part of the Shek Wai Kok constituency, which is currently represented by Man Yu-ming.

Education
Wo Yi Hop is in Primary One Admission (POA) School Net 64, which includes multiple aided schools (schools operated independently of the government but funded with government money); none of the schools in the net are government schools.

References

External links

 Delineation of area of existing village Wo Yi Hop (Tsuen Wan) for election of resident representative (2019 to 2022)
 Antiquities Advisory Board. Historic Building Appraisal. Lau Ancestral Hall, Wo Yi Hop Pictures

Villages in Tsuen Wan District, Hong Kong
Tsuen Wan District